The 2021 Northwestern Wildcats football team represented Northwestern University during the 2021 NCAA Division I FBS football season. The Wildcats played their home games at Ryan Field in Evanston, Illinois, and competed in the West Division of the Big Ten Conference. They were led by 16th-year head coach Pat Fitzgerald. They finished the season 3–9, 1–8 in Big Ten play to finish in a tie for last place in the West division.

Previous season 
The Wildcats finished the 2020 season 7–2, 6–1 in Big Ten play to win the West division. In a season initially canceled due to the ongoing COVID-19 pandemic, the Wildcats only played conference opponents and had one game canceled due to COVID-19 protocols. They qualified for the Big Ten Championship Game where they lost to Ohio State. They received a bid to the Citrus Bowl where they defeated Auburn 35–19.

Schedule

Source

Roster

Rankings

References

Northwestern
Northwestern Wildcats football seasons
Northwestern Wildcats football